Mary Butt may refer to:

 Mary Martha Sherwood (1775–1851), née Butt, writer of children's literature
 Mary Elizabeth Butt (1903–1993), Texas philanthropist